Marco Hesina (born 6 December 1991) is an Austrian footballer currently playing for FC Union Innsbruck in the Tiroler Liga.

External links
 

1991 births
Living people
Austrian footballers
FC Wacker Innsbruck (2002) players
WSG Tirol players
2. Liga (Austria) players
Austrian Football Bundesliga players
Association football forwards